Voskan Yerevantsi (1614–1674) was one of the first Armenian book publishers during the years 1640–1666. He published the Bible in Amsterdam on October 13, 1668, which is believed to be one of the best samples of old Armenian printing.

Biography
Voskan Yerevantsi was born in 1614 in New Julfa (Nor Jugha), the son of parents who had been deported from Yerevan in 1604–1605 during the relocation ordered by Shah Abbas I of Persia.

References

 Armenology Research National Center: THE ARMENIAN BOOK 1512-1920
 Garegin Levonyan, The Armenian Book And The Printing Art, Yerevan, 1946.
 Knarik Korkotyan, The Armenian Printed Book In Constantinople, Yerevan, 1964

1614 births
1674 deaths
Persian Armenians
Armenian printers
Dutch publishers (people)
17th-century people of Safavid Iran
Businesspeople from Isfahan